This is a summary of 1946 in music in the United Kingdom.

Events
February – Kathleen Ferrier's recording contract with Columbia Records expires, and she transfers to Decca.
21 March – Swedish premiere of Peter Grimes, the opera's first performance outside the UK, in Stockholm.
June – George Formby is awarded the Order of the British Empire in the 1946 King's Birthday Honours List.
5 July – Michael Tippett arranges the first British performance of Monteverdi's Vespers at Morley College, adding his own organ Preludio for the occasion.
6, 7 & 9 August – Leonard Bernstein conducts the first US performance of Peter Grimes at the Berkshire Music Center, Tanglewood.

Popular music
Geraldo and his Orchestra – "We'll Gather Lilacs" (Ivor Novello)
Archie Lewis and The Geraldo Strings – "I Dream of You (More Than You Dream I Do)"  
"It's A Pity To Say Goodnight" – (Billy Reid)

Classical music: new works
Malcolm Arnold – Symphony for Strings, Opus 13
Edmund Rubbra – Cello Sonata, Opus 60
Michael Tippett – Little Music for String Orchestra
Ralph Vaughan Williams – Concerto for Two Pianos and Orchestra, co-arranged with Joseph Cooper
William Walton – String Quartet No. 2 in A minor

Opera
Benjamin Britten – The Rape of Lucretia

Film and Incidental music
William Alwyn – I See a Dark Stranger, starring Deborah Kerr and Trevor Howard.
John Ireland – The Overlanders.
Alan Rawsthorne – The Captive Heart, starring Michael Redgrave.

Musical theatre
7 March – The London production of Song of Norway opens at the Palace Theatre and runs for 526 performances.
19 December – Noël Coward's new musical Pacific 1860 opens at the Theatre Royal, Drury Lane, starring Mary Martin and Graham Payn.

Musical films
 Gaiety George, released July 22, starring Richard Greene and Ann Todd.
 I'll Turn to You, directed by Geoffrey Faithfull, starring Terry Randall and Don Stannard
 The Laughing Lady, directed by Paul L. Stein, starring Anne Ziegler and Webster Booth
 London Town, released September 30, starring Sid Fields, Greta Gynt, Petula Clark, Kay Kendall and Sonny Hale and featuring Tessie O'Shea and Beryl Davis.
 The Magic Bow, directed by Bernard Knowles, starring Stewart Granger and Phyllis Calvert

Births
3 January – John Paul Jones (Led Zeppelin)
6 January – Syd Barrett (Pink Floyd) (died 2006)
10 January – Aynsley Dunbar, drummer and songwriter 
22 January – Malcolm McLaren, impresario and founder of the Sex Pistols (died 2010)
7 March – Matthew Fisher (Procol Harum)
21 March – Ray Dorset (Mungo Jerry)
1 April – Ronnie Lane, singer, songwriter and guitarist (The Faces) (died 1997)
2 April – Raymond Gubbay, classical music promoter
4 April – Dave Hill, guitarist (Slade)
11 April – Bob Harris, DJ
10 May 
Donovan, folk singer
Graham Gouldman, singer and songwriter (10cc)
Dave Mason, singer-songwriter and guitarist (Traffic and Fleetwood Mac)
15 May – Aly Bain, Scottish fiddler (The Boys of the Lough)
16 May – Robert Fripp, guitarist, composer and record producer
18 May – Bruce Gilbert, guitarist (Wire and Dome)
15 June - Noddy Holder, singer and songwriter (Slade)
19 July – Alan Gorrie, Scottish singer and bass player (Average White Band and Forever More)
23 July – Andy Mackay, saxophonist, oboist, and composer
10 August – Peter Karrie, star of West End musical productions
1 September – Barry Gibb, singer and songwriter
5 September – Freddie Mercury, singer (Queen) (died 1991)
23 September – Duster Bennett, blues singer and musician (died 1976)
28 September – Helen Shapiro, singer
14 October
Justin Hayward, guitarist, singer and songwriter (The Moody Blues)
Dan McCafferty (Nazareth)
29 October – Peter Green, guitarist and singer
8 November – Roy Wood, singer and songwriter (The Move, Wizzard)
11 November – Chip Hawkes, vocalist and guitarist (The Tremeloes)
24 November – Bev Bevan, drummer (Electric Light Orchestra, Black Sabbath)
1 December – Gilbert O'Sullivan, singer-songwriter
10 December – Ace Kefford, bass player
12 December – Clive Bunker, drummer (Jethro Tull, Electric Sun, Solstice, and Aviator)
14 December – Jane Birkin, French-based actress and singer
16 December – Trevor Pinnock, harpsichordist and conductor
29 December – Marianne Faithfull, singer and actress

Deaths
29 January – Sidney Jones, conductor and composer, 84
20 February – Hugh Allen, organist and choral conductor, 76
13 March – Thomas Dunhill, composer and music writer, 69
13 April – W. H. Bell, composer and conductor, 72
1 May
Edward Bairstow, organist and composer, 71
Percy Whitlock, organist and composer, 42 (tuberculosis)
16 October – Sir Granville Bantock, composer, 78
10 November – Nicholas Gatty, composer and music critic, 72
5 December – Tom Clare, music hall singer and pianist, 70
15 December – Frederic Norton, composer, 77

See also
 1946 in British television
 1946 in the United Kingdom
 List of British films of 1946

References

 
British Music, 1946 In
British music by year